Thierry "Ted" Benoit (25 July 1947 – 30 September 2016) was a French comic artist, graphic novelist and prominent figure in the stylish Franco-Belgian ligne claire comics scene in the 1980s. His influences included Edgar P. Jacobs, Moebius, Robert Crumb and to a lesser extend Jacques Tardi.

Among his works from the 1980s are Bingo Bongo et son Combo Congolais, a series about aspiring novelist Bingo B. Bongo and his travails; and Ray Banana, a film noir pastiche. Some of these were published in English in Heavy Metal.

Benoit illustrated two books in the Blake and Mortimer series, both written by Jean Van Hamme:  The Francis Blake Affair, 1996; and The Strange Encounter, 2001. Benoit died on 30 September 2016 at the age of 69.

Published albums 

1979: Hôpital, Les Humanoïdes Associés
1981: Vers la ligne claire, Les Humanoïdes Associés
1982: Histoires vraies, written by Yves Cheraqui, Les Humanoïdes Associés
1982: Berceuse électrique, Ray Banana T.1, Casterman
1986: Cité Lumière, Ray Banana T.2, Casterman
1987: Bingo Bongo et son combo congolais, Les Humanoïdes Associés
1989: L'Homme de nulle part, Les mémoires de Thelma Ritter T.1, drawn by Pierre Nedjar, written by Ted Benoit, Casterman
1996: L'Affaire Francis Blake, Blake et Mortimer T.13, written by Jean Van Hamme, Éditions Blake et Mortimer
2001: L'Étrange Rendez-vous, Blake et Mortimer T.15, written by Jean Van Hamme, Éditions Blake et Mortimer
2004: Playback, drawn by François Ayroles, adapted by Ted Benoit from a script by Raymond Chandler, Éditions Denoël
2013: Camera Obscura – Vers la ligne claire et retour, Champaka.
2014: La Philosophie dans la piscine, Ray Banana T.3, La Boîte à bulles.

References

External links
Ted Benoît at Lambiek's Comiclopedia

1947 births
2016 deaths
French cartoonists
People from Niort